Naujoji Vilnia railway station is a Lithuanian Railways station in Vilnius. The station was built around 1860.

The station was built during the Saint Petersburg–Warsaw Railway expansion. In 1940-1941 the Soviet government did mass deportation to Siberia from Naujoji Vilnia railway station.

It is used mainly by industry, but it also organizes commercial passengers trips to Kaunas, Trakai, Ignalina, Kena and Turmantas.

References 

Railway stations in Vilnius